The William Helffrich House is a historic house located at 1200 Plainfield Avenue in Orange Park, Florida. It is locally significant as a frame vernacular house with Gothic Revival influences, and for being one of Orange Park's largest 19th century houses.

Description and history 
Built in 1878

It was added to the National Register of Historic Places on July 15, 1998.

References

External links
 Clay County listings at National Register of Historic Places

National Register of Historic Places in Clay County, Florida
Houses on the National Register of Historic Places in Florida
Houses in Clay County, Florida
Houses completed in 1882